The Big Ten Conference Pitcher of the Year is a baseball award given to the Big Ten Conference's most outstanding pitcher. The award was first given following the 1994 season.

Key

Winners

Winners by school

Footnotes
 Wisconsin discontinued its baseball program after the 1991 season.

References

Awards established in 1983
Player
NCAA Division I baseball conference players of the year